"Love Incredible" is a song by Norwegian disc jockey and record producer Cashmere Cat, featuring Cuban-American singer Camila Cabello. It is Cabello's first solo single since leaving the American girl group Fifth Harmony. The electropop and R&B-pop song was released on February 17, 2017, through Interscope Records and Mad Love as the third single from Cashmere Cat's debut studio album, 9 (2017).

Background and composition

In May 2016, Camila Cabello and Benny Blanco spent time in a recording studio, where they recorded "Love Incredible". The song was leaked on January 30, 2017, and is Cabello's first solo single since leaving Fifth Harmony in December 2016.

Musically, "Love Incredible" is an electropop and R&B-pop song, which contains elements of dance. The song begins mellow with Cabello using a high vocal register, accompanied by synthesizers that pick up with a thumping drumbeat. The music is built around a grinding electronic dance music chorus, where Cabello sings over glassy keyboards and a muted bassline, "This love's incredible, credible / Have a little mercy on me, baby / You got me wanting more, wanting more / Of your love".

Critical reception
Kat Bein from Billboard compared the song to Cashmere's previous releases, describing it as a "tune that sounds like it fits in perfectly with the rest of the work from his upcoming debut LP 9." Christina Lee of Idolator praised the production and Cabello's vocals on the song, calling it "dramatic, though dreamy electro-pop that still has enough sing-along moments for summer festival playlists to come, with processed vocals featured alongside Camila's own falsetto. Danny Schwartz of the site HotNewHipHop also praised the song's production and wrote that it is "an accurate summation of the Cashmere Cat aesthetic: a strawberry Starbust of a pop song with an unexpected and enrapturing vocoder-gasm appended to the end." Sasha Geffen from MTV News gave a different opinion about Cabello's voice on the song, writing: "Cashmere Cat whips Camila's voice through a bevy of effects, making her sound more like a giddy android than a girl-group expat."

Credits and personnel
Credits adapted from the liner notes of 9.

Publishing
 Published by Infinite Stripes / Back Hair Music Publishing (BMI) / Administered by Universal Music Publishing (BMI), Please Don’t Forget To Pay Me Music / Administered by Universal Music Publishing (GMR), MSMSMSM Ltd (PRS) / Brill Building Music Publishing LLC all rights administered by Kobalt Music Group., Milamoon Songs (BMI), TNT Explosive / UMPG (ASCAP), TNT Explosive / UMPG (ASCAP)

Management
 Camila Cabello appears courtesy of Epic Records, a division of Sony Music Entertainment

Personnel
 Cashmere Cat – DJ, songwriting, production
 Camila Cabello – vocals, songwriting
 Benny Blanco – songwriting, production
 Sophie – songwriting, production
 R. City – songwriting

Charts

References 

2017 songs
2017 singles
Interscope Records singles
Song recordings produced by Benny Blanco
Songs written by Camila Cabello
Songs written by Sophie (musician)
Songs written by Cashmere Cat
Songs written by Benny Blanco
Song recordings produced by Cashmere Cat
Song recordings produced by Sophie (musician)
Cashmere Cat songs
Camila Cabello songs